Neonemobius mormonius, known generally as the Mormon ground cricket or collared ground cricket, is a species of ground cricket in the family Gryllidae. It is found in North America.

References

Further reading

 
 

Ensifera
Insects described in 1896